Rafael Costa dos Santos (born 23 August 1987 in São Luís, Maranhão), simply known as Rafael Costa, is a Brazilian footballer who plays for Sampaio Corrêa, on loan from Guarani as a striker.

Career
Rafael is a striker who was an athlete of the Avaí Futebol Clube, but before he defended the Força Sports Club, football club in São Paulo.

Marked the history of the team from Santa Catarina, for her series on a campaign of conquest access to Series 2009.

In 2009 it was agreed his loan until the end of the year for the Itumbiara of Goiás, but eventually returned to Avaí soon after fighting where the Championship Goiano Itumbiara was third. On August 14, 2009, was borrowed directly by the club on loan at William and Mogi Mirim.

In late April 2010, Rafael returned to perform at Avaí. In its game reestréia the B team for the Copa Avaí of Santa Catarina, one of the goals he scored the team's away win.

In June 2011, Rafael left Avaí for Brasileiro Série D team Metropolitano and had good performances in his three-year stint at the club. In May 2013, he moved to Série B team Figueirense and continued successful playing career.

On 19 January 2014, it was announced that Rafael joined South Korean side FC Seoul. He scored two goals in AFC Champions League

On 15 July 2014,  it was announced that Rafael joined Brazilian side Ponte Preta by loan from FC Seoul.

On 7 January 2015, it was announced that Rafael joined Brazilian side Joinville EC by loan from FC Seoul.

On 3 July 2015, it was announced that Rafael joined Brazilian side Ceará Sporting Club by loan from FC Seoul

Career statistics

Brazil League 
(Correct )

K League 1 
(Correct )

References

External links
Goal  

1987 births
Living people
Brazilian footballers
Campeonato Brasileiro Série A players
Campeonato Brasileiro Série B players
Campeonato Brasileiro Série D players
K League 1 players
Avaí FC players
Itumbiara Esporte Clube players
Mogi Mirim Esporte Clube players
Esporte Clube São José players
Clube Atlético Hermann Aichinger players
Clube Atlético Metropolitano players
Figueirense FC players
Joinville Esporte Clube players
Associação Atlética Ponte Preta players
FC Seoul players
Ceará Sporting Club players
Associação Desportiva São Caetano players
Clube de Regatas Brasil players
Botafogo Futebol Clube (SP) players
Guarani FC players
Brazilian expatriate footballers
Expatriate footballers in South Korea
Brazilian expatriate sportspeople in South Korea
Association football forwards